Peter Luczak was the defending champion, but he was eliminated by Dušan Lojda in the quarterfinal.
Denis Gremelmayr won in the final 6–1, 6–2, against Andrey Kuznetsov.

Seeds

Draw

Finals

Top half

Bottom half

External Links
Main Draw
Qualifying Singles

Poznan Porsche Open - Singles
2010 Singles